Rhinotragus is a genus of beetles in the family Cerambycidae, containing the following species:

 Rhinotragus analis Audinet-Serville, 1833
 Rhinotragus antonioi Clarke, 2012
 Rhinotragus apicalis Guérin-Méneville, 1844
 Rhinotragus bizonatus Gounelle, 1911
 Rhinotragus conformis Monné & Fragoso, 1990
 Rhinotragus dorsiger Germar, 1824
 Rhinotragus festivus Perty, 1832
 Rhinotragus longicollis Bates, 1880
 Rhinotragus lucasii Thomson, 1860
 Rhinotragus martinsi Penaherrera-Leiva & Tavakilian, 2003
 Rhinotragus monnei Clarke, 2012
 Rhinotragus robustus Penaherrera-Leiva & Tavakilian, 2003
 Rhinotragus sulphureus Giesbert, 1991
 Rhinotragus trilineatus White, 1855
 Rhinotragus trizonatus Blanchard in Griffith, 1832

References

Rhinotragini